Manavayal is a village in the Pattukkottai taluk of Thanjavur district, Tamil Nadu, India.

Demographics 

As per the 2011 census, Manavayal had a total population of 545. As of the preceding census in 2001, Manavayal had a total population of 516 with 249 males and 267 females. The sex ratio was 1.072. The literacy rate was 63.03.

References 

 

Villages in Thanjavur district